Cineriz was an Italian media company, involved primarily in the production and distribution of films, founded in the early 1950s by the businessman Angelo Rizzoli. The company catalogue counts also many films directed by Federico Fellini, Gillo Pontecorvo, Luchino Visconti, Michelangelo Antonioni, Pier Paolo Pasolini, Pietro Germi, Roberto Rossellini and Vittorio De Sica.

The company closed down in 1993 after a series of economical and judiciary controversies.

Films produced by Cineriz
 8½
 Africa Addio
 Before the Revolution
 Boccaccio '70
 La commare secca
 L'eclisse
 The Flowers of St. Francis
 Mondo Cane

Films distributed in Italy by Cineriz

 The 400 Blows
 An Average Little Man
 Le belle famiglie
 La Dolce Vita
 Fantozzi (film)
 Juliet of the Spirits
 Me, Me, Me... and the Others
 Move and I'll Shoot
 In the Name of the Pope King
 Ro.Go.Pa.G.
 Il secondo tragico Fantozzi
 Sunday Heroes
 The Traffic Policeman
 Satyricon
 The Psychic, or Sette note in nero
 Una jena in cassaforte (1967)
 Bionda fragola 

Film production companies of Italy
Film distributors of Italy
Defunct film and television production companies
Mass media companies established in the 1950s
Mass media companies disestablished in 1993